Ras Bu Fontas station is one of stations of the Doha Metro's Red Line. It serves the Al Wakrah Municipality, namely Al Wakrah City, Ras Abu Fontas and Barwa Village.

History
As part of the metro's Phase 1, the station was inaugurated on 8 May 2019, along with most other Red Line stations.

Station facilities
Among the station's facilities are a Qatar National Bank ATM, a prayer room and restrooms.

Metro Link Bus
There is one metrolink, which is the Doha Metro's free feeder bus network, servicing the station:
M126, which serves Barwa Village (Mesaimeer).

Connections
The station is served by bus routes 109, 119, and 129.

References

Doha Metro stations
2019 establishments in Qatar
Railway stations opened in 2019